This a List of people from Evansville, Indiana. This list includes people who either were born in Evansville, Indiana or lived in or around the city for a period of time.

Government, law and activism

 Albion Fellows Bacon, reformer and writer
 Conrad Baker, 15th Governor of Indiana (1867-1873) and 15th Lieutenant Governor (1861-1867)
 George Washington Buckner, physician, U.S. minister to Liberia
 Larry Bucshon, U.S. Representative (2011–present)
 Suzanne Crouch, current Lieutenant Governor of Indiana and former Indiana State Auditor
 Roger O. DeBruler, Justice of the Indiana Supreme Court (1968-1996)
 Charles Harvey Denby, U.S. Union officer in the Civil War; diplomat
 Charles Denby Jr., U.S. diplomat in China and later in Vienna, Austria
 Edwin C. Denby, Secretary of the Navy (1921-1924) and notable figure in the Teapot Dome scandal
 Winfield K. Denton, U.S. Representative (1949-1953, 1955–1966)
 Brad Ellsworth, U.S. Representative (2007-2011), 2010 Democratic nominee for U.S. Senate
 John H. Foster, U.S. Representative (1905-1909)
 John W. Foster, U.S. Secretary of State (1892-1893)
 James S. Harlan, lawyer and commerce specialist
 John Hostettler, U.S. Representative (1995-2007)
 Henry S. Johnston, 7th Governor of Oklahoma
 Joseph Lane, General, first Governor of Oregon Territory, one of Oregon's first two U.S. Senators, and 1860 candidate for Vice President on the Democratic Party ticket
 Robert D. Orr, 45th Governor of Indiana (1981-1989)
 Gary R. Pfingston, 10th Chief Master Sergeant of the Air Force (1990-1994)
 Randall Shepard, Chief Justice of the Indiana Supreme Court
 Sallie Wyatt Stewart, former President of the National Association of Colored Women
 Barbara Underwood, Attorney General of New York

Sports and sports-related

 Marty Amsler, NFL defensive end
 Chic Anderson, sportscaster
 Aaron Barrett, MLB pitcher
 Alan Benes, MLB pitcher
 Andy Benes, MLB pitcher, member of US Olympic team, #1 draft pick
 Sean Bennett, NFL player, New York Giants
 McKinley Brewer, Negro league baseball player
 Drew Butera, MLB catcher
 Jamey Carroll, MLB infielder
 Rudy Charles, WWE & former Total Nonstop Action Wrestling referee
 Calbert Cheaney, Harrison High School, Indiana and NBA player
DeLisa Chinn-Tyler, softball outfielder
 Deke Cooper, North High School, University of Notre Dame, NFL player
 Jerry Dale, MLB umpire
 Phelps Darby, coach of Indiana Hoosiers men's basketball team
 Luke Drone, NFL and AF2 player
 Todd Duffee, UFC fighter, actor
 Jerad Eickhoff, MLB pitcher for Philadelphia Phillies 
 Bob Ford, North High School, Purdue basketball player, sportscaster
 Bob Griese, Rex Mundi High School, Purdue and NFL quarterback, All-Pro, Hall of Famer, Super Bowl champion, sportscaster
 Harley Grossman, MLB pitcher
 Bob Hamilton, professional golfer, winner of 1944 PGA Championship
 Kevin Hardy, Harrison High School, University of Illinois, NFL linebacker
 Lilly King, swimmer, gold medalist at 2016 Summer Olympics
 Michael Klueh, swimmer, world champion
 Luke Kruytbosch, sportscaster
 Kyle Kuric, Memorial High School, University of Louisville basketball player, professional basketball player in Spain
 Khristian Lander, Reitz High School, Indiana University and Western Kentucky University
 Don Mattingly, MLB player for New York Yankees, former manager of Los Angeles Dodgers, current manager of Miami Marlins
 Walter McCarty, NBA player, assistant coach for Indiana Pacers and Boston Celtics, former head coach for University of Evansville. 
 Arad McCutchan, basketball coach
 Dorothy Montgomery, All-American Girls Professional Baseball League player; cytologist at Welborn Clinic
 Jerry Nemer (1912–1980), basketball player and attorney
 Ray Newman, MLB player for Chicago Cubs and Milwaukee Brewers
 Jeff Overton, professional golfer
 Tubby Rohsenberger, NFL player
 Scott Rolen, MLB Hall of Fame third baseman
 Vince Russo, former WWE and Total Nonstop Action Wrestling writer; podcaster for Podcast One
 Dave Schellhase, basketball player, Purdue University
 Dru Smith, Reitz High School, NBA Player
 Paul Splittorff, MLB pitcher, Kansas City Royals
 Larry Stallings, NFL linebacker, St Louis Cardinals
 Scott Studwell, NFL player, Minnesota Vikings
 Ray Cariens, Racing Driver
 Thomas Edwards, ESPN Director

Performing and visual arts

Actors, actresses and directors

 AJ Alexander, Playboy model and actress
Tom Armstrong, cartoonist creator of Marvin
 Billie Bennett, silent-film actress
 Budd Boetticher, film director
 Avery Brooks, actor, known for Star Trek: Deep Space Nine and Spenser: For Hire
 Joe Cook, actor, entertainer, and comedian
 Louise Dresser, Academy Award-nominated actress
 David Emge, actor, known for Dawn of the Dead
 Ron Glass, actor, known for Barney Miller and Firefly
 Phil Goss, actor and TV personality in Poland, voice-over professional for MTV and VH1 in Europe
 Michael Michele, actress, best known for ER
 Marilyn Miller, singer and dancer of 1920s and 1930s
 Dylan Minnette, actor, known for his roles in 13 Reasons Why, Alexander and the Terrible, Horrible, No Good, Very Bad Day and Goosebumps
 Roger Mobley, child actor of 1960s, later a Christian pastor in Texas
 Venus Raj, actress, model, beauty queen crowned Miss Indiana Teen USA 2006, Miss Indiana USA 2009, Binibining Pilipinas Universe 2010 and she placed 4th Runner-Up at the Miss Universe 2010
 Jama Williamson, actress, known for playing Principal Mullins in the Nickelodeon series School of Rock and Wendy Haverford in "Parks and Recreation"

Music

 Michael Barber, rapper, music producer
 Kyle Burns, musician, member of Forever the Sickest Kids
 Sid Catlett, musician, jazz drummer
 John Cowan, singer, bassist John Cowan Band and New Grass Revival
 Jody Davis, guitarist for Newsboys
 Neal Doughty, keyboard player, REO Speedwagon's only remaining founding member
 Jace Everett, country music singer
 Josh Gard, electronic music producer, DJ
 Ernie Haase, Southern gospel tenor vocalist for the Cathedral Quartet and Ernie Haase & Signature Sound 
 Joe Hinton, R&B singer; biggest hit "Funny", 1964
 Philip Martin Lawrence II, American songwriter, record producer, entrepreneur, and voice actor; best known for his work with The Smeezingtons and teaming with Bruno Mars
 Mock Orange, indie-rock band
 Noncompliant, DJ and record producer
 Dax Riggs, musician
 Fred Rose, musician, Hall of Fame songwriter and music publishing executive
 Ryan Seaton, gospel solo artist formerly of Ernie Haase & Signature Sound (2003 - 2009)
 Timmy Thomas, singer-songwriter, musician, record producer
 Andy Timmons, guitarist, musical director, and solo artist
 Geno Washington, soul singer

Media and artists
 David Horsey, cartoonist for Los Angeles Times
 Edward McKnight Kauffer, artist and graphic designer, grew up in Evansville 
 Barbara Kinney, photojournalist and White House photographer during Clinton administration
 Karl Kae Knecht, cartoonist for Evansville Courier
 Casey Stegall, national correspondent for Fox News Channel
 William Snyder (photojournalist), four-time Pulitzer Prize winning photographer

Authors, producers, playwrights, writers, and poets

 Marilyn Durham, author of The Man Who Loved Cat Dancing
 Bettiola Heloise Fortson, poet and author of Mental Pearls: original poems and essays
 Annie Fellows Johnston, author of The Little Colonel series
 Edward J. Meeman, journalist and environmental crusader, born in Evansville in 1889
 Molly Newman, playwright and television producer
 Paul Osborn, playwright, screenwriter of East of Eden
 Steven Sater, Broadway lyricist, playwright and poet
 Winifred Sackville Stoner Jr., prolific child author and poet
 Matt Williams, producer of The Cosby Show, Home Improvement, and Roseanne

Academics
 Margaret K. Butler, mathematician
 Elbert Frank Cox, mathematician
 Raymond Geuss, philosopher and university professor
 Clark Kimberling, mathematician
 Paul Musgrave, professor and expert in American foreign policy matters
 Henry Babcock Veatch, philosopher and writer
 John D. Wiley, educator
 Lester M. Wolfson, founding chancellor of Indiana University South Bend

Business

 Charles T. Hinde, successful businessman, riverboat captain, and original investor of the Hotel del Coronado
 Mary Fendrich Hulman, wife of industrialist Tony Hulman and matriarch of the Hulman-George family
 Edward Mead Johnson, businessman, co-founder of Johnson & Johnson, and founder of Mead Johnson & Co.
 Aaron Patzer, entrepreneur and founder of Mint.com, a personal financial management service
 Francis Joseph Reitz, banker, civic leader, and philanthropist
 John Augustus Reitz, lumber magnate, civic leader, and philanthropist
 Harry J. Sonneborn, 1st President & CEO of McDonald's  (played by actor B.J. Novak in the film "Founder")
 Ray Ryan, gambler, oilman, promoter, developer
 Cari Tuna, philanthropist
 Ruth Siems, Stove Top Stuffing creator

Religion
 Mary Simpson, one of the first women ordained a priest by the American Episcopal Church
 John Roach Straton, minister
 Paul E. Waldschmidt, Roman Catholic bishop
 Mike Warnke, Christian comedian, discredited "expert" on Satanism

References

 
Evansville, Indiana
Evansville